The Grand Central School of Art was an American art school in New York City, founded in 1923 by the painters Edmund Greacen, Walter Leighton Clark and John Singer Sargent. The school was established and run by the Grand Central Art Galleries, an artists' cooperative founded by Sargent, Greacen, Clark, and others in 1922. The school was directed by Greacen, Sargent and Daniel Chester French and occupied  on the seventh floor of the east wing of the Grand Central Terminal in New York City. Press accounts of the school's opening reception mentioned the following instructors:  Greacen, George Pearse Ennis, sculptor Chester Beach, muralists Ezra Winter and Dean Cornwell, the illustrator and costume designer Helen Dryden, Nicolai Fechin, Julian Bowes and George Elmer Browne.

The school had more than 400 students its first year and soon grew to 900, making it one of the largest art schools in the city. Greacen engaged Arshile Gorky as an instructor, probably the school's most prominent teacher.  Another instructor was Harvey Dunn, whose comments were captured by a student during one five-hour class session and were published in 1934 in a slim volume titled An Evening in the Classroom. For some years the school held a summer session in Eastport, Maine. After nearly 20 years of operation, the school closed in 1944.

The school has no relationship to the current Grand Central Academy of Art, despite the similarities in name and a shared humanist perspective. The academy, also in New York City, was established by the Institute of Classical Architecture and Classical America (ICA&CA), founded as two separate nonprofit organizations in 1991 and 1968.

Notable alumni

Charles Addams
James E. Allen
Revington Arthur
Clare Bice
Hans Burkhardt
Gerald Curtis Delano
John Philip Falter
Arnold Friberg
Mary Goldsmith
Walter Tandy Murch
Stow Wengenroth
Arthur Sarnoff
Norman Rockwell
Harold Von Schmidt
John Clymer
Jack Coggins
F. Luis Mora
Alex Raymond
James Gordon Irving
Frank J. Reilly
Frank DuMond
Robert F. Gault AWS
Edmund Greacen
Pruett Carter
Frank Panabaker
Ken Riley
Saul Tepper
Norman Saunders
Emmett Watson
Bob Kane
Stuart Davis
Ethel Schwabacher
Arshile Gorky
Willem de Kooning
Roselle Osk
Molly Guion
John Dehner

References

External links 
 Online oral history with cartoonist Creig Flessel

Culture of New York City
Art schools in New York City
American artist groups and collectives
Education in New York (state)
Educational institutions established in 1923
Educational institutions disestablished in 1944
Defunct private universities and colleges in New York City
Arts organizations established in 1923
School of Art
1923 establishments in New York City